The Never Ending Tour is the popular name for Bob Dylan's endless touring schedule since June 7, 1988.

Background
The Never Ending Tour 1994 started with eleven concerts in Japan. Two days later Dylan performed in Malaysia, his first and to date, only concert there to date. Dylan then went on to perform concerts in Singapore and Hong Kong.

On April 5 Dylan started a twenty-five stop date of North America starting in Springfield, Illinois and coming to an end just over a month later in Memphis, Tennessee.

Prior to continuing to tour in Europe, he returned to Japan, performing at The Great Music Experience from May 20–22.

Dylan travelled to Europe in midsummer to perform seventeen concerts in Europe, his only performances there of 1994.

Sixteen days after completing his European tour Dylan returned to the United States to perform fifteen concerts including his triumph performance at Woodstock '94. After being injured in a traffic accident in 1966, and his subsequent disappearance from the popular music scene, Dylan declined to go to the original Woodstock Festival of 1969, even though he lived in the area at the time and the festival had been put in his backyard to try to get him to come out and play. He set off for the Isle of Wight Festival the day the Woodstock festival started, and performed at Woodside Bay on 31 August 1969. Dylan, however, did accept an invitation to perform at Woodstock '94, and was introduced with the phrase: "We waited twenty-five years to hear this, Ladies and gentlemen, Mr. Bob Dylan!" According to various critics, Dylan's performance was one of the greater moments of the festival, and represented the beginning of another one of the new phases in his lengthy career.

Dylan continued his United States Tour on October 1 in Ithaca, New York. The tour continued through the fall in the eastern United States ending on November 13 in New Orleans, Louisiana. Inspired by the success of his appearance at Woodstock ’94 Dylan performed on MTV Unplugged which resulted in the live album "MTV Unplugged"

Tour dates

Notes

References

External links

BobLinks – Comprehensive log of concerts and set lists
Bjorner's Still on the Road – Information on recording sessions and performances

Bob Dylan concert tours
1994 concert tours